Stanisław Kuś (1 February 1925 - 7 July 2020) was a Polish constructor and architect. The Aleppo International Stadium was built based on his design.

References

 Jerzy Kerste, "Profesor Stanisław Kuś w 85 rocznicę urodzin i 60 rocznicę działalności inżynierskiej i naukowej”, Politechnika Rzeszowska 2010.

External links
 Ludzie nauki (OPI)

1925 births
Polish civil engineers
2020 deaths